Thailand competed in the 2021 Asian Youth Para Games which will be held in Manama, Bahrain from 2 to 6 December 2021. Thailand contingent has 107 athletes who will compete in nine sports.

Competitors
The following is the list of number of competitors in the Games:

Medalists

References

Thailand 2021
Asian Youth Para Games
Asian Youth Para Games, 2021
Nations at the 2021 Asian Youth Para Games